Acorypha glaucopsis is a species of short-horned grasshopper in the family Acrididae. It is found in Africa, the Arabian Peninsula, and South Asia.

Human consumption
It is eaten by the Dogon people of Mali.

Gallery

References

External links
 
 
 Names in Dogon languages, with images from Mali

Acrididae
Insects described in 1870
Orthoptera of Africa
Edible insects